The Taming of the Queen is a historical novel by British author Philippa Gregory, published on 13 August 2015. It tells the story of Kateryn Parr, the last wife of Henry VIII of England.

Plot 
Henry VIII of England chooses Kateryn Parr, a 31-year-old widow, as his new wife. Aware of the ends that Henry's other wives met, Kateryn is a studious woman who promotes projects, including advocating for Scriptures in English and supporting the Protestant Reformation. Henry suffers from gout and a leg wound that will not heal throughout the novel. Parr ensures Princess Mary and Princess Elizabeth are re-legitimized by the crown.

External links

References

2015 British novels
Novels by Philippa Gregory
Novels set in Tudor England
Simon & Schuster books